Utah State Route 126 may refer to one of the following state highways in Utah, United States:

 Utah State Route 126 (1931-1933), a former state highway in Millard County connecting Oak City with Lynndyl
 Utah State Route 126 (1933-1969), a former state highway in Beaver County connecting Greenville with SR-21 (north of Greenville)
 Utah State Route 126 (May–August 1977), a temporary renumbering of Utah State Route 82 in Box Elder County connecting Tremonton with SR-13 (east of Garland)
 Utah State Route 126, the current state highway in Davis, Weber, and Box Elder counties connecting Layton with South Willard

See also

 List of state highways in Utah
 List of highways numbered 126

External links